Oliver Wonekha is a Ugandan politician and diplomat, who serves as Uganda's Ambassador to the People's Republic of China, since 2022. She previously served as the country's Ambassador to the United States of America, from 2013, until 2017 and thereafter as Uganda's High Commissioner to the Republic Of Rwanda between 2017 and 2022.

Background and education
Wonekha was born in present-day Bududa District, circa 1951. She holds a Bachelor of Science degree from Makerere University, in Kampala, Uganda's capital. She also holds a Postgraduate Diploma in Education, also from Makerere.

Work experience
She worked in the coffee sector for 30 years, starting circa 1971, before she entered politics. She worked at the now defunct Coffee Marketing Board and later for the privately owned Kyagalanyi Coffee Limited.

Political career
In 2011, Wonekha entered Uganda's elective politics by contesting the Mbale District Women's Constituency, in the Ugandan parliament. She won and served in that capacity during the eighth parliament (2001–2006). In 2006, she contested the Bududa District Women's Constituency, on the ruling National Resistance Movement political party. She won and served in that capacity in the 9th parliament (2006–2011). During the 2011 election cycle, she lost her seat. Following her loss in the Ugandan parliament, she unsuccessfully contested for the East African Legislative Assembly.

Diplomatic career
In 2013, she was named Uganda's Ambassador to the United States, where she presented her credentials to President Barack Obama on 22 July 2013. In January 2017, she was transferred to Rwanda, as Uganda's ambassador to that country, replacing Richard Kabonero who was transferred to the Republic of Tanzania. She presented her credentials to President Paul Kagame, on 11 October 2017. In 2022 she assumed her current post as Uganda's Ambassador to China

See also
 Districts of Uganda
 East African Community

References

Living people
Ugandan women ambassadors
Members of the Parliament of Uganda
Ambassadors of Uganda to the United States
People from Bududa District
People from Eastern Region, Uganda
Ambassadors of Uganda to Rwanda
Women members of the Parliament of Uganda
1951 births